
Gmina Dwikozy is a rural gmina (administrative district) in Sandomierz County, Świętokrzyskie Voivodeship, in south-central Poland.

Villages
Gmina Dwikozy contains the villages and settlements of Bożydar, Buczek, Czermin, Dwikozy, Gałkowice, Gierlachów, Góry Wysokie, Kamień Łukawski, Kępa Chwałowska, Kolonia Gałkowice, Mściów, Nowe Kichary, Nowy Garbów, Nowy Kamień, Romanówka, Rzeczyca Mokra, Rzeczyca Sucha, Słupcza, Stare Kichary, Stary Garbów, Szczytniki, Winiarki and Winiary.

Neighbouring gminas
Gmina Dwikozy is bordered by the town of Sandomierz and by the gminas of Gorzyce, Obrazów, Ożarów, Radomyśl nad Sanem, Wilczyce and Zawichost.

References

 Polish official population figures 2006

Dwikozy
Sandomierz County